Asaphodes chlamydota is a moth in the family Geometridae. It is endemic to New Zealand, and can be found in the lower part of the North Island and in the South Island.  It inhabits native forest and shrublands. The larvae of this species feeds on native Clematis plants including Clematis afoliata. Adults are on the wing from November to April and are regarded as having intermedia flight powers.

Taxonomy
This species was first described by Edward Meyrick in 1883 as Epyaxa chlamydota. Later in 1884 Meyrick gave a more detailed description of the newly named species. George Hudson further discussed the species in his 1898 volume New Zealand Moths and Butterflies and referred to it as Xanthorhoe chlamydota. Hudson again discussed and illustrated this species in his 1928 book The butterflies and moths of New Zealand. In 1939 Louis Beethoven Prout placed this species in the genus Larentia. This placement was not accepted by New Zealand taxonomists. In 1971 John S. Dugdale assigned this species to the genus Asaphodes. Although Dugdale confirmed this placement in 1988 he mentions the possibility that this species might not fall within the genus Asaphodes. The male lectotype, collected at Akaroa, is held at the Canterbury Museum.

Description 

Hudson described the species as follows:

Distribution 
A. chlamydota is endemic to New Zealand. It can be found in the lower North Island and the South Island. Meyrick stated this species was present in Wellington, Christchurch and Akaroa, and Hudson mentioned the species is present in the Wellington Botanic Garden. Specimens of this species have been collected in the mid Canterbury. A. chlamydota was also found to be present in the Dansey ecological district in Otago.

Ecology and habitat
 
The habitat of this species is amongst forest and shrubland. It has been found at altitudes of below 500 m.

Host plants

A. chlamydota larvae feed on plants within the genus Clematis including Clematis afoliata and Clematis marata.

Flight patterns

A. chlamyota adults are regarded as having intermediate flight powers and remain active during light breezes.

Behaviour 
Adult A. chlamydota are regarded as normally being present during the months of November to April. However specimens have also been collected in October.

References

Moths described in 1883
Moths of New Zealand
Larentiinae
Endemic fauna of New Zealand
Taxa named by Edward Meyrick
Endemic moths of New Zealand